The Cordillera Darwin Metamorphic Complex is a geologic complex composed chiefly of metamorphic rocks located in southern Tierra del Fuego. It has been suggested that the Cordillera Darwin Metamorphic Complex is analogous to the Eastern Andes Metamorphic Complex. The Cordillera Darwin Metamorphic Complex is the only metamorphic complex in the southern Andes known to have amphibolite facies rocks containing kyanite and sillimanite which evidences high-grade metamorphism. High-grade metamorphism took place during the Cretaceous purportedly in association with the closure of the Rocas Verdes Basin.

The protoliths of Cordillera Darwin Metamorphic Complex are unrelated to Tierra del Fuego Igneous and Metamorphic Complex despite present-day proximity.

References 

Geology of Magallanes Region
Geology of Tierra del Fuego
Metamorphic complexes
Lithodemic units of Argentina
Lithodemic units of Chile